The Harvard Civil Rights – Civil Liberties Law Review is a student-run law review published by Harvard Law School. The journal is published two times per year and contains articles, essays, and book reviews concerning civil rights and liberties. As of 2014, it was the leading progressive law journal in the United States. In 2009, its online companion Amicus was launched, which features standard length journal articles coupled with online responses. In 2018, the journal launched its podcast, Taking Liberties, which features panel discussions on current events related to civil rights and civil liberties, interviews with scholars and practitioners who fight for them, and tributes to those who have contributed to the advancement of civil rights throughout history.

History
The journal was established in Spring 1966 by students Spencer H. Boyer (later Professor and Associate Dean at Howard Law School), Joseph Meisser, and Frank Parker in the wake of the Civil Rights Act of 1964 and the Voting Rights Act of 1965. The funds for the establishing the journal, a figure of $600 as requested by Boyer, were granted after a short meeting with Harvard Law School Dean Ervin Griswold. In their first issue the editors of the new publication wrote that the review "is an emblem and achievement of the collaboration" between the Harvard Civil Liberties Research Service, the Law Students Civil Rights Research Council, and the Harvard Civil Rights Committee, three newly formed organizations that had recently noticed the dearth of legal material on civil rights:

Still, there is today hardly a journal which regularly and completely dedicates its pages to the civil rights revolution and the modern manifestations of the relation between citizen and state. Nor is there any review steadily providing Southern lawyers with library ammunition. Nor does any publication capitalize on the burgeoning interest in rights and liberties among this new generation of law students. Nor does any review endeavor to link together the students and faculties of the various law schools in such a cooperative enterprise.

These are among our aims.

But most important. Ours is to be a review of revolutionary law. Such an ideal is as new as United Nation Declarations on Human Rights and as old as the "Grand Tradition" of Common Law fashioning causes of action to rights and wrongs.

In its 35th anniversary issue, legal academic Morton Horowitz wrote that the journal "seeks to catalyze progressive thought and dialogue through publishing innovative legal scholarship from various perspectives and in diverse fields of study."

Notable alumni
Charles F. Abernathy
Deborah Batts
Jacqueline A. Berrien
James H. Burnley
Morgan Chu
Stuart E. Eizenstat
John R. Evans
Robert Fellmeth
Jennifer Granholm
Mark J. Green
Joseph A. Greenaway, Jr.
William J. Jefferson
Susan Oki Mollway
Barack Obama
Jorge Rangel
Daniel P. Sheehan
Cass Sunstein

Notable articles

References

External links
 

Publications established in 1966
Biannual journals
American law journals
English-language journals
Harvard University academic journals
Law journals edited by students
Constitutional law journals